Luca Stolz (born 29 July 1995) is a German racing driver who currently competes in the ADAC GT Masters and GT World Challenge Europe.

Career
Stolz began his racing career in 2007, competing in the Cadet class of the Belgian Karting Championship. He raced in karts until 2010, before moving into single-seaters in 2011. He made his debut in the 2011 ADAC Formel Masters, driving for URD Rennsport. In his maiden season of formula competition, Stolz finished 12th in the championship. The following season, he moved to the German Formula Three Championship, initially competing in the Trophy class for HS Engineering, before stepping up to the overall championship beginning at TT Circuit Assen.

For 2013, Stolz began competing in sports car racing, joining Land Motorsport for the 2013 Porsche Carrera Cup Germany season. He made his GT World Challenge Europe Sprint Cup debut the following season, driving alongside Lucas Wolf for HTP Motorsport. Despite only competing in half the season, the duo would finish fourth in the Silver Cup class. For 2016, Stolz joined the Lamborghini GT3 Junior Program, which led to a full-season GT World Challenge Europe campaign with GRT Grasser Racing Team. Stolz and co-driver Michele Beretta were crowned Silver Cup champions of the Sprint Cup that season, claiming four class victories in ten races.

2017 saw Stolz join Mercedes-AMG Team Black Falcon for the Endurance Cup; the team with which he and co-drivers Yelmer Buurman and Maro Engel would claim the 2018 Blancpain GT Series Endurance Cup title. 2018 also saw Stolz make his 24 Hours of Le Mans debut, driving for Keating Motorsports. The team finished 29th overall, and third in the LMGTE Am class. After competing with Black Falcon in 2019 and Haupt Racing Team in 2020, Stolz and Engel joined Toksport WRT for the 2021 season.

In 2022, Stolz began competing in the DTM, driving for Haupt Racing Team. Throughout the season, he developed a reputation for staying out of the media limelight, preferring to essentially let his driving do the talking. He claimed his first DTM race win at the Nürburgring, taking victory in the second event of the weekend. 2022 also saw Stolz take victory at the Bathurst 12 Hour with Kenny Habul, Martin Konrad, and Jules Gounon. The following year, Stolz, Habul, and Gounon went back-to-back, winning the 2023 edition of the race as well.

Racing record

Career summary

* Season still in progress.

Complete GT World Challenge Europe Endurance Cup results

* Season still in progress.

Complete GT World Challenge Europe Sprint Cup results

Complete Deutsche Tourenwagen Masters results
(key) (Races in bold indicate pole position; races in italics indicate fastest lap)

† As Stolz was a guest driver, he was ineligible to score points.

Complete IMSA SportsCar Championship results
(key) (Races in bold indicate pole position; results in italics indicate fastest lap)

References

External links
Luca Stolz at the 24 Hours of Spa-Francorchamps
Luca Stolz at Racing Reference

1995 births
Living people
German racing drivers
ADAC Formel Masters drivers
German Formula Three Championship drivers
Blancpain Endurance Series drivers
ADAC GT Masters drivers
WeatherTech SportsCar Championship drivers
Deutsche Tourenwagen Masters drivers
Mercedes-AMG Motorsport drivers
Nürburgring 24 Hours drivers
FIA Motorsport Games drivers
Performance Racing drivers
Karting World Championship drivers
Porsche Motorsports drivers
24H Series drivers
Toksport WRT drivers
Craft-Bamboo Racing drivers
Porsche Carrera Cup Germany drivers
Asian Le Mans Series drivers